The Noemvriana ("November Events") of  , or the Greek Vespers (after the Sicilian Vespers}, was a political dispute which led to an armed confrontation in Athens between the royalist government of Greece and the forces of the Allies over the issue of Greece's neutrality during World War I.

Friction existed between the two sides from the beginning of World War I. The unconditional surrender of the border fortress of Roupel in May 1916 to the Central Powers' forces, mainly composed of Bulgarian troops, was the first event that led to the Noemvriana. The Allies feared the possibility of a secret pact between the Greek royalist government and the Central Powers. Such an alliance would endanger the Allied army in Macedonia bivouacking around Thessaloniki since the end of 1915. Intensive diplomatic negotiations between King Constantine I and Allied diplomats took place throughout the summer. The king wanted Greece to maintain her neutrality, a position that would favor the Central Powers plans in the Balkans while the Allies wanted demobilization of the Hellenic army and the surrender of war materiel equivalent to what was lost at Fort Roupel as a guarantee of Greece's neutrality. By the end of the summer of 1916, the failure of negotiations, along with the Bulgarian Army's advance in eastern Macedonia and the Greek government's orders for the Hellenic army not to offer resistance, led to a military coup by Venizelist military officers in Thessaloniki with the support of the Allies. The former Prime Minister Eleftherios Venizelos, who from the very beginning supported the Allies, established a provisional government in northern Greece. He began forming an army to liberate areas lost to Bulgaria, but this effectively split Greece into two entities.

The inclusion of the Hellenic army along with Allied forces, as well as the division of Greece, sparked several anti-Allied demonstrations in Athens. In late October, a secret agreement was reached between the king and the Allied diplomats. The pressure from the military advisers forced the king to abandon this agreement. However, it met organized resistance and an armed confrontation took place until a compromise was reached at the end of the day. The day after the Allied contingent evacuated from Athens, a royalist mob began rioting throughout the city, targeting supporters of Venizelos. The rioting continued for three days, and the incident became known as the Noemvriana in Greece, which in the Old Style calendar occurred during the month of November. The incident drove a deep wedge between the Venizelists and the royalists, bringing closer what would become known as the National Schism.

Following the Noemvriana, the Allies, determined to remove Constantine I, established a naval blockade to isolate areas which supported the king. After the resignation of the king on 15 June 1917, Greece unified under a new king, Alexander, Constantine I's son, and the leadership of Eleftherios Venizelos. It joined World War I on the side of the Allies. By 1918, the mobilized Hellenic Army provided the numerical superiority the Allies needed on the Macedonian front. The Allied army shortly thereafter defeated the Central Powers forces in the Balkans, followed by the liberation of Serbia and the conclusion of World War I.

Background

Greece emerged victorious after the 1912–1913 Balkan Wars, with her territory almost doubled. The unstable international political climate of the early 20th century placed Greece in a difficult position. The ownership of the Greek occupied eastern Aegean islands was contested by the Ottoman Empire which claimed them as their own. In the north, Bulgaria, defeated in the Second Balkan War, was engineering revanchist strategies against Greece and Serbia. The assassination of Archduke Franz Ferdinand of Austria in Sarajevo precipitated Austria-Hungary's declaration of war against Serbia. This caused Germany and Austria-Hungary, and countries allied with Serbia (the Triple Entente) to declare war on each other, starting World War I.

Greece, like Bulgaria, initially maintained neutrality during the conflict. The Greek leadership was divided between the Prime Minister Eleftherios Venizelos, who supported Great Britain on the side of the Allies and King Constantine who was educated in Germany and married to the Kaiser's sister. The king admired Prussian militarism and was anticipating a quick German victory. The king wanted Greece to remain neutral in the conflict, a strategy favorable to Germany and the Central Powers.

In early 1915, Britain offered Greece "territorial concessions in Asia Minor" if it would participate in the upcoming Gallipoli Campaign. Venizelos supported this idea, while the king and his military advisers opposed it. Dismayed at the king's opposition, the prime minister resigned on 21 February 1915. A few months later, Venizelos' Liberal Party won the May elections, and formed a new government. When Bulgaria mobilized against Serbia in September 1915, Venizelos ordered a Greek counter-mobilization and asked the Anglo-French army to defend Thessaloniki and aid Serbia. The Allies, led by General Maurice Sarrail, began landing on 22 September 1915 and entrenched around the city. The Greek parliament gave Venizelos a vote of confidence to help Serbia, yet the king unconstitutionally dismissed the prime minister along with the parliament. This unlawful order escalated the animosity between the king and Venizelos as well as their loyal followers. The Liberals boycotted the December elections.

Causes

Surrender of Fort Rupel

On 9 May 1916, Erich von Falkenhayn, Chief of the German General Staff, informed Athens of the imminent advance of German-Bulgarian forces. In reply, Athens minimized the importance of General Sarrail's movements and requested Falkenhayn to change his strategy. On 23 May, Falkenhayn guaranteed that the territorial integrity of Greece and the rights of its citizens would be respected. On 26 May, despite an official protest by the Greek government, 25,000 Bulgarian soldiers led by German cavalry invaded Greece. The Greek forces at Fort Rupel surrendered. The German Supreme Command was concerned about Allied General Sarrail's movements and Falkenhayn was ordered to occupy strategic positions inside Greek territory, specifically Fort Rupel. Despite the assurances of Falkenhayn, Bulgarian soldiers immediately began to forcibly round up the Greek population into large cities, namely Serres, Drama and Kavala. German attempts to restrain Bulgarian territorial ambitions were partially successful, yet on 4 September, Kavala was occupied by the Bulgarian Army.

Reactions of Venizelos and the Allies
The surrender of Fort Rupel caused the Allies to believe that the German-Bulgarian advance was a result of a secret agreement between Athens and the Central Powers, as they were assured that no Bulgarian force would invade Greek territory. The Allies saw this as a violation of Greek neutrality and a disturbance in the balance of power in the Balkans. The Allied press, especially in France, demanded swift military action against Greece to protect the Allied forces in Macedonia. For Venizelos and his supporters, the surrender of Fort Rupel signaled the loss of Greek Macedonia. On 29 May, Venizelos proposed to Sir Francis Elliot (senior British diplomat in Athens) and Jean Guillemin (senior French diplomat in Athens) that he and General Panagiotis Danglis should establish a provisional government in Thessaloniki to mobilize the Greek army to repel the Bulgarians. Venizelos pledged that the army would not move against the King and the royal family. According to Elliot's report, Venizelos hoped that the "success of his action and pressure of the public opinion might at the last moment convert His Majesty". The proposal had French support. However it met with strong opposition from Britain, forcing Venizelos to abandon the plan.

On 9 June the Allies held a conference in London to examine the reasons behind the quick surrender of Fort Rupel and favored a complete demobilization of the Greek army and navy. King Constantine anticipated the results of the conference and ordered a partial demobilization on 8 June. The tension between the royal government and the Allies continued since 'anti-Allied activities' in Athens were ignored by the Greek Government. On 12–13 June, a mob destroyed Venizelist newspapers: Nea Ellas, Patris, Ethnos, and Estia. The mob proceeded to the British Embassy as police idly stood by without interfering. This incident gave France the political ammunition to persuade Britain that more extreme measures were needed. On 17 June, the London conference decided "that it was absolutely necessary to do something to bring the king of Greece and his Government to their senses".

Military coup of Thessaloniki

On 27 August 1916, during a demonstration in Athens, Venizelos explained his disagreements with the King's policies. Venizelos said that the King had become a victim of his advisers, whose aims were to destroy the goals of the Goudi revolution. Additionally, Venizelos appealed to the King to pursue a policy of benevolence and true neutrality. Venizelos ended his speech by stating that "if this proposal does not lead to success then there are other means to protect the country from complete catastrophe". The King refused to accept any compromise, including meeting with a committee sent by Venizelos.

Two days later, army officers loyal to Venizelos organized a military coup in Thessaloniki and proclaimed the "Provisional Government of National Defence". Despite the support of the army, the provisional government was not officially recognized by Venizelos nor the Allied powers. Venizelos criticized this course of action, noting that without the support of the Allied army, the movement would fail immediately. This further polarized the population between the royalists (also known as anti-Venizelists), and Venizelists. The newly founded separate "provisional state" included Northern Greece, Crete and the Aegean Islands. The "New Lands", won during the Balkan Wars, broadly supported Venizelos, while the "Old Greece" was mostly pro-royalist. Venizelos, Admiral Pavlos Kountouriotis and General Panagiotis Danglis formed a triumvirate provisional government and on 9 October moved to Thessaloniki to assume command of the National Defense. They directed Greek participation in the Allied war effort in direct conflict with the royal wishes in Athens. According to a British diplomat:

From the very beginnings, Venizelos continued his appeals to the king to join forces to jointly liberate Macedonia. Venizelos wrote:

Venizelos' moderation did not convince many citizens, even among his own followers. It was only after the end of 1916 and the "Noemvriana" that he pushed for a radical solution to end the stalemate.

Constantine–Bénazet agreement

After the creation of the provisional government in Thessaloniki, negotiations between the Allies and the King intensified. The Allies wanted further demobilization of the Greek army and the removal of military forces from Thessaly to insure the safety of their troops in Macedonia. The king wanted assurances that the Allies would not officially recognize or support Venizelos' provisional government and guarantees that Greece's integrity and neutrality would be respected. After several unproductive negotiations, on 23 October the king suddenly agreed to some of the demands required by the Allies including the removal of the Greek army from Thessaly. The king also volunteered war materiel and the Greek navy to assist them. In exchange, the king requested French Deputy Paul Bénazet to keep this agreement secret from the Central Powers.

On 3 November, Vice-Admiral du Fournet, commander-in-chief of the Allied Mediterranean fleet, used the sinking of two Greek merchant ships by a German submarine, as well as the secret agreement, to demand the surrender of the docked Greek war ships and took command of the Salamis naval arsenal. The Greek government yielded, and on 7 November, the partial disarmament of Greek warships began. The Allies towed away 30 lighter craft. Three weeks later the French took over the Salamis naval base completely, and began using Greek ships operated by French crews.

The Constantine–Bénazet agreement was short-lived due to Venizelos' military plans as well as pressure exerted by the military in Athens, led by the king, regarding the forced Greek disarmament. The army of the Defence confronted against the royalist army at Katerini (and by January 1917 had taken the control of Thessaly). This action at Katerini met with some disapproval among the Allied circles and among his own associates in Athens. Answering these criticisms Venizelos wrote to A. Diamandidis:

The Venizelist advance was not an attempt to undermine the king's pact with Bénazet, since it had been planned long before that. The failure of the secret agreement was caused by subversive activities within segments of the royalist government in Athens to paralyze and disrupt the Thessaloniki provisional government.

Last diplomatic efforts before the events
The seizure of Greek ships by the Allies, the Katerini incident and the Franco-British violations of Greece's territorial integrity offended the national honor of a segment of "Old Greece" and increased the king's popularity. The king refused to honor his secret agreement with Bénazet and soldiers who requested to fight against the Bulgarian occupation were charged with "desertion to the rebels". A growing movement amongst the low rank officers within the army, led by Ioannis Metaxas and Sofoklis Dousmanis, were determined to oppose disarmament and any assistance to the Allies.

Diplomacy failed despite continuing pressure applied by the Allies against Athens. On 24 November, du Fournet presented a seven-day ultimatum demanding the immediate surrender of at least ten Greek mountain artillery batteries. Du Fournet was instructed not to use force to take possession of the batteries. The admiral made a last effort to persuade the king to accept France's demands. He advised the king that he would land an Allied contingent, and occupy certain positions in Athens until all the demands were accepted by Greece. The king said that the citizens of Greece, as well as the army, were against disarmament, and only promised that the Greek forces would not attack the Allies.

Despite the gravity of the situation, both the royalist government and the Allies made no serious effort to reach a diplomatic solution. On 29 November, the royalist government rejected the proposal of the Allies and armed resistance was organized. By 30 November military units and royalist militia (the epistratoi, "reservists") from surrounding areas had been recalled and gathered in and around Athens (in total over 20,000 men) and occupied strategic positions, with orders not to fire unless fired upon. The Allied commanders failed in their assessment of the situation, disregarding Greek national pride and determination, causing them to conclude that the Greeks were bluffing. The Allies thought that in the face of a superior force, Greeks would "bring the cannons on a plater" (surrender); a viewpoint that Du Fournet also shared.

The Battle of Athens, 1916

On early morning of  the Allies landed a 3,000-strong marine force in Piraeus, and headed towards Athens. When the Allied troops reached their designated positions, they found them already occupied by Greek troops. For more than two hours both sides stood facing each other. Some time in the morning, an unknown origin rifle shot was fired and the battle of Athens began. Each side blamed the other for firing first. Once the battle spread throughout the city, the king requested a ceasefire proposing a solution and reach a compromise. Du Fournet, with a small contingent of troops was unprepared to encounter organized Greek resistance, and was already short of supplies, so readily accepted the king's compromise. However, before an agreement was finalized, the battle resumed. The Greek battery from Arditos Hill fired a number of rounds at the entrance of Zappeion where the French admiral had established his headquarters. The Allied squadron from Phaliron responded by bombarding sections of the city, mostly around the Stadium and near the Palace. Discussions soon were resumed and a final compromise was reached. The king compromised to surrender just six artillery batteries camouflaged in the mountains instead of the ten that the Allied Admiral demanded. By late afternoon the battle was finished. The Allies had suffered 194 casualties, dead and wounded, and the Greeks lost 82, not counting civilians. By early morning of 2 December, all Allied forces had been evacuated.

The role of the Venizelists during the battle has been intensely contested by witnesses and historians. Vice Admiral Louis Dartige du Fournet wrote that Venizelists supported the Allies and attacked passing Greek royalist army units. Venizelists participation was allegedly so extensive, that lead Admiral du Fourne wrote in his report that he had been involved in a civil war. The Venizelists continued fighting after the evacuation of the Allied marines until the next day, when they capitulated. The royalists claimed that large caches of weapons and ammunition were found in their strongholds packed in French military containers. Venizelists were led to prison surrounded by a furious mob and supposedly only the royal army escorts saved them from being murdered by the angry citizens. Other historians deny that the Venizelists collaborated with the Allied forces: Pavlos Karolidis, a contemporary royalist historian, argues that no Venizelist attacked their fellow citizens and the only weapons found during the raids on prominent Venizelists' houses were knives.

The following days

The authorities used the pretext of the events to claim that the Venezelists had staged an insurrection with the support of Allied troops and proceeded with the help of the Reservists to extensive arrests and reprisals against them. The entire operation was led by two army generals; troops of the military district of Athens took orders from General K. Kallaris and the soldiers of the active defense were commanded by General A. Papoulas (later commander-in-chief of the Asia Minor expedition). The terror and destruction that followed soon went out of hand, making even the respectable conservative newspaper Politiki Epitheorisis (Political Review) that at the beginning urged Greek "justice" to "smite mercifully the atrocious conspiracy" and to purge all followers of the "archconspirator of Salonika [Venizelos]", in the end to urge "prudence". During the following three days houses and shops of Venizelists were ransacked and 35 people were murdered. Chester says that most of those who were murdered were refugees from Asia Minor. Many hundreds were imprisoned and kept in solitary confinement. Karolidis characterizes the imprisonment of certain prominent Venizelists, such as Emmanuel Benakis (mayor of Athens), as a disgrace. Some authors argue that Benakis was not only arrested and imprisoned but also disrespected and ill-treated. Seligman describes that they were only released 45 days later after a strong demand contained within the Entente ultimatum, which was accepted on 16 January. Opposing reports also exist, e.g. Abbot asserts that during the evacuation of the Allied forces, many "criminals" and "collaborators" on the payrolls of different Allied spy agencies slipped out of Athens at night after allegedly "terrorizing the city for nearly a year". Due to his failure Vice-Admiral Dartige du Fournet was relieved of his command.

Aftermath
In Greece, this incident became known as Noemvriana (November events, using the Old Style calendar), and marked the culmination of the National Schism.

Political situation in Greece and Europe
On , Britain and France officially recognized Venizelos government as the only lawful government of Greece, effectively splitting the country. On , Venizelos' government officially declared war on the Central Powers.

Mainwhile in Athens Constantine praised his generals. There were also in circulation various pro-royalist and religious brochures calling Venizelos "traitor" and "Senegalese goat". A royal warrant for the arrest of Venizelos was issued and the Archbishop of Athens, pressured by the royal house, anathematised the prime minister (in a special ceremony with the crowd throwing stones to an effigy of Venizelos).

In France, the premiership of Aristide Briand, a leading proponent of engaging with Constantine to bring about a reconciliation of the two Greek administrations, was threatened by the events in Athens, leading to the reorganization of the French government. In Britain, Prime Minister H. H. Asquith and foreign minister Sir Edward Grey resigned and were replaced by Lloyd George and Arthur Balfour. The change in the British leadership proved to be particularly important for Greece, since Lloyd George was a known Hellenophile, an admirer of Venizelos and dedicated to resolving the Eastern Question.

The fall of the Romanovs in Russia (who refused the French proposals for Constantine's removal from the throne), caused France and Great Britain to take more drastic measures against King Constantine. In June they decided to invoke their obligation as "protecting powers" and demanded the king's resignation. Charles Jonnart said to Constantine: "The Germans burned my native town, Arras. I will not hesitate to burn Athens". Constantine accepted and on 15 June 1917 went into exile. His son Alexander, who was considered to have Allies sympathies, became the new King of Greece instead of Constantine's elder son and crown prince, George. The king's exile was followed by the deportation of many prominent royalist officers and politicians considered pro-Germans, such as Ioannis Metaxas and Dimitrios Gounaris, to France and Italy.

The course of events paved the way for Venizelos to return to Athens on 29 May 1917. Greece, now unified, officially joined the war on the side of the Allies. The entire Greek army was mobilized (though tensions remained inside the army between supporters of the Constantine and supporters of Venizelos) and began to participate in military operations against the Central Powers on the Macedonian front.

The Macedonian front

By the fall of 1918, the Greeks, with over 300,000 soldiers, were the single largest component of the Allied army on the Macedonian front. The Greek army gave the much needed advantage to the Allies that altered the balance between the two sides on the Macedonian front. On 14 September 1918, under the command of French General Franchet d'Esperey, a combined Greek, Serbian, French and British force launched a major offensive against the Bulgarian and German army. After the first serious battle (see battle of Skra) the Bulgarian Army gave up its defensive positions and began retreating towards their country. On 29 September, the armistice with Bulgaria was signed by the Allied command. The Allied army pushed north and defeated the remaining German and Austrian forces. By October 1918 the Allied armies had recaptured all of Serbia and were preparing to invade Hungary. The offensive was halted because the Hungarian leadership offered to surrender in November 1918, marking the dissolution of the Austro-Hungarian empire. This ended the First World War since Germany lacked forces to stop the Allies from invading Germany from the south. The participation of the Greek army at the Macedonian front was one of the decisive event of the war, earning Greece a seat at the Paris Peace Conference under Venizelos.

See also
The Great War

Notes

Footnotes

References

 Books

 Journals

External links
 

1916 in Greece
1916 riots
Constantine I of Greece
Ioannis Metaxas
Macedonian front
Military history of Athens
Military history of Greece during World War I
Modern history of Athens
Political riots
Riots and civil disorder in Greece